Mannheim station may refer to:
Mannheim station (Illinois), a train station in Franklin Park, Illinois, US
Mannheim Hauptbahnhof, a railway station in Mannheim, Baden–Würtemberg, Germany
Mannheim-Handelshafen station, a railway station in Mannheim
Mannheim-Waldhof station, a railway station in Mannheim
Mannheim ARENA/Maimarkt station, a railway station in Mannheim
Neu-Edingen/Mannheim-Friedrichsfeld station, a separation station in Mannheim